Mall Airways was an American regional airline which operated throughout the northeastern United States and eastern Canada from 1973 to 1989. The carrier operated a mixed fleet of Beechcraft 1900, Piper Navajo Chieftains, Beech 99 Airliners, and also occasionally utilized a Beech King Air 90 as a back-up aircraft. The airline was based in Albany, New York, and was acquired by Business Express Airlines in September, 1989.  Business Express retained both BE1900C, N15394 and N15503.

Destinations served
Connecticut
Hartford (Bradley International Airport)
New Jersey
Newark (Newark Liberty International Airport)
Atlantic City, New Jersey
New York
Albany (Albany International Airport)
Binghamton (Greater Binghamton Airport)
Buffalo (Buffalo Niagara International Airport)
Elmira (Elmira-Corning Regional Airport)
Islip (Long Island MacArthur Airport)
Ithaca (Ithaca Tompkins Regional Airport)
New York (LaGuardia Airport)
Rochester (Greater Rochester International Airport)
Syracuse (Syracuse Hancock International Airport)
White Plains (Westchester County Airport)
Ontario, Canada
Toronto (Toronto Pearson International Airport)
Pennsylvania
Erie (Erie International Airport) 
Quebec, Canada
Montreal (Montréal-Pierre Elliott Trudeau International Airport)
Rhode Island
Providence (T.F. Green Airport)
Virginia
Washington, DC (suburbs) (Dulles International Airport)

Fleet
Beechcraft 1900
Beech King Air 90
Beechcraft Model 99
Piper PA-31-350 Navajo Chieftain

See also 
 List of defunct airlines of the United States

External links

Defunct airlines of the United States
Airlines established in 1973
Airlines disestablished in 1989